Billy Jernigan (September 8, 1923 – March 2, 1997) was an American wrestler. He competed in the men's freestyle flyweight at the 1948 Summer Olympics.

References

External links
 

1923 births
1997 deaths
American male sport wrestlers
Olympic wrestlers of the United States
Wrestlers at the 1948 Summer Olympics
Sportspeople from Tulsa, Oklahoma